Jean "Mamie" Ceniza Wraith (born May 10, 1970) is an American former professional tennis player.

Ceniza, who is of Filipino descent, grew up in the town of Hawkinsville in Georgia. She played college tennis for the UCLA Bruins and partnered with Iwalani McCalla to win the NCAA doubles championship in her senior year in 1992. The pair received wildcards to the main draw of the 1992 US Open.

As a professional player, she reached a career best singles ranking of 307 in the world, with her best WTA Tour performance a second round appearance at Curitaba in 1993. She won two doubles titles on the satellite tour.

ITF Circuit finals

Doubles: 6 (2 titles, 4 runner-ups)

References

External links
 
 

1970 births
Living people
American female tennis players
UCLA Bruins women's tennis players
Tennis people from Georgia (U.S. state)
American sportspeople of Filipino descent